Sarah Rice is an American theatre actress known for her work in the Stephen Sondheim productions Sweeney Todd and A Little Night Music, the former of which won her a Theatre World Award in 1979.

Early years
Rice was born in Okinawa, Japan, while her father was serving in the U.S. Air Force there. Before her first birthday, the family moved to Arizona, where she, a sister, and two brothers grew up. Rice acted in some amateur productions and attended college for one year before she moved to New York at age 18.

Career 
Although Rice initially sought to use her ballet training to perform in classical dance, one of her early roles was that of Louisa in The Fantasticks. On Broadway, she portrayed Johanna in Sweeney Todd (1979). She is also known for her Montreal performance of Andrew Lloyd Webber's The Phantom of the Opera, and her operatic performances in The Marriage of Figaro, The Barber of Seville and The Student Prince.

Personal life
Rice resides in New York City with her husband, John Hiller.

References

External links

Official site

American stage actresses
American musical theatre actresses
21st-century American opera singers
Year of birth missing (living people)
Living people
21st-century American actresses
21st-century American women singers